Mazz Murray (born 26 November 1974) is an English stage and TV  actress, voice artist and singer with a three octave range.
 
As an actress she is known for her theatre roles, including portrayals of Patsy Cline, Dusty Springfield and Vivian Ellis in tribute shows.

Career
She portrayed the Killer Queen in the West End production of the musical We Will Rock You. She is the longest-running cast member to be involved in the show, having been in the original ensemble when the musical opened in May 2002. She took over the principal role of Killer Queen from Sharon D. Clarke in April 2004.

In 2010, she formed a girl group, Woman, with her sister Gina, Anna-Jane Casey and Emma Kershaw, debuting their single "I’m a Woman".

In 2015, she joined the cast of the London production of Mamma Mia! as Tanya, a role which was subsequently taken over by Kate Graham when Murray departed in 2017.

It was announced that she would join the cast of Chicago from 2 July 2018 until 11 August 2018, playing the role of Matron Mama Morton.

In 2019, it was announced that Murray would be returning to the West End production of Mamma Mia! in the role of Donna Sheridan.

Personal life
Murray was born in London, and is the daughter of songwriter Mitch Murray and actress Grazina Frame. She trained at Redroofs Theatre School, Maidenhead and Sylvia Young Theatre School, London. 

On 18 June 2009 she married Oren Harush (born 27 July 1980), an Israeli.
Brian May played a special version of "Love of My Life", with some new words with Mazz at their wedding. The couple live in Bushey, Hertfordshire, England. Murray is a supporter of Manchester United F.C.

Theatre credits
 We Will Rock You – Killer Queen
 Fame – Mabel
 Rent – Maureen
 Pippin – Berthe
 Boogie Nights – Debs
 Only the Lonely – Patsy Cline
 A Girl Called Dusty – Dusty Springfield
 Sweet Charity
 Fiddler on the Roof
 Chicago – Matron Mama Morton
 Mamma Mia! – Tanya and Donna Sheridan
 Sunset Boulevard – Norma Desmond

Television
 Blessed – Shop Assistant (1 episode: "Who Wrote the Book of Love?")
 Footballers' Wives – Jenny Taylor
 EastEnders – Miranda (2 episodes)
 Fimbles – Yodelling Echo
 The Quest – Lizzie

References

External links
 
 Profile - CastAway Voice Actors & Actresses
 Brian May's Soapbox About Mazz's Wedding

1973 births
English musical theatre actresses
Living people
Actresses from London